was a Japanese football player and manager. He played for the Japan national team.

Club career
Kikugawa was born in Fujieda on September 12, 1944. After graduating from Meiji University, he joined the Mitsubishi Motors in 1968. The club won the league championships in 1969 and 1973. The club won the  1971 and 1973 Emperor's Cups. He retired in 1974. He played 94 games and scored 2 goals in the league. He was selected as one of the Best Eleven in 1969.

International career
In October 1969, he was selected for the Japan national team for the 1970 World Cup qualification. At the qualification on October 12, he debuted against South Korea. He also played at the 1970 Asian Games. He played 16 games for Japan until 1971.

Coaching career
After retirement in 1982, Kikugawa signed with a new club, the Chuo Bohan (later Avispa Fukuoka), based in his local league in Fujieda and became a manager. In 1991, he got the club promoted to the Japan Soccer League Division 2. He resigned in 1994. In 1999, he succeeded Takaji Mori as manager for one season.

Personal life and death
Kikugawa died from pneumonia on December 2, 2022, at the age of 78.

Career statistics

Club

International

Managerial statistics

Honours
 Japan Soccer League Best Eleven: 1969

References

External links
 
 Japan National Football Team Database

1944 births
2022 deaths
People from Fujieda, Shizuoka
Meiji University alumni
Association football people from Shizuoka Prefecture
Japanese footballers
Association football defenders
Japan international footballers
Japan Soccer League players
Urawa Red Diamonds players
Japanese football managers
J1 League managers
Avispa Fukuoka managers
Footballers at the 1970 Asian Games
Asian Games competitors for Japan